Anthony Lee Santerre (born September 7, 1968) is a retired American stock car racing driver. He is a former competitor in the NASCAR Busch Series and a four-time champion of the NASCAR Busch North Series.

Personal life 
At the age of 19, Santerre was diagnosed with Guillain–Barré syndrome, which had him hospitalized for several months.

Busch Series and Craftsman Truck Series career 
Andy Santerre made his Busch debut in 1993, driving for his own #15 O'Connor Buick team. He ran his first and only race of the year at NHIS, starting the race in 11th position and finished the race in 14th.

Santerre made two starts in 1994. He ran the #51 Chevy at Nazareth and finished 18th. The next time out, running the #1 Primetime Van Oldsmobile Cutlass Supreme, Santerre set his best qualifying effort to that point of 8th in the field at Watkins Glen International. However, he only ran four laps and finished 39th with transmission problems.

All three of those races, however, were combination Busch North-Busch Grand National Series races, a procedure popular in NASCAR until the Winston West and Busch North Series were combined into a single rules package, to increase car counts in regional races.

Santerre made a Busch Series start in 1996 while earning points a Busch North driver, when he drove the #35 Ford for Mike Laughlin Jr. at Daytona. He started deep in the pack in 40th, but had a 22nd-place finish.

Santerre made his official Busch Series debut in a one-off appearance in 1997. All Busch Series finishes through 1996 for Santerre were 'combination races' with the Busch North Series. Once again driving for Laughlin, Santerre started the #45 Hunters Specialties Chevy at New Hampshire. He started 16th and upped his position by one to 15th. Also, Santerre led his first lap of Busch Series competition during a green flag pit cycle.

Santerre, after numerous wins in the Busch North Series, moved South in 1998, where he would win Rookie of the Year with Innovative Motorsports. However, despite the award, it was still a tough season. Santerre's best finishes were a 4th at Gateway and a 10th at Richmond. He had a pole at Richmond finished 20th in overall points, despite missing two races.

Santerre began 1999 with a broken leg at Daytona, and was not able to return to the #47 Chevy for 16 races, returning with a 30th at the Glen. Yet, just three races later, Santerre took control late in the race at Pikes Peak. Leading seventeen laps, earned to his first career victory. Despite this, Santerre was released four races later.

Santerre ran seventeen races in 2000, sharing a ride Kenny Wallace in the #25 Lance Snacks Chevy for Team Rensi Motorsports. His best finish was at Pikes Peak, where he had a third-place finish. He also tallied on three other top-10s. Also in 2000 Santerre made his only career Craftsman Truck Series start. Driving the #57 Whelen Ford, Santerre made the 2000 Watkins Glen race. Once again, Santerre made a good debut. He started 21st, ran on the lead lap and finished 16th.

In 2001, Santerre ran 13 races for three teams. Running for the #01 EJP team, #11 Channellock team and the #31 Whelen team. For the third straight year, the #11 Chevy at Pikes Peak recorded Santerre's best finish of the year of 13th place. Overall, Santerre had four top-20 finishes.

Santerre made his last two starts in 2002. He earned a 38th at New Hampshire and 36th at Nazareth. At that point, Santerre dropped all Busch Series racing and went back to the North Series.

Busch North Series / East Series career 
Santerre stayed in the Charlotte area, and based his Busch North team in the middle of Charlotte, becoming a four-time champion of the Busch North Series, holding the record for most series championships, and winning them consecutively from 2002–2005.

At the end of the 2005 season, he stepped out of the car and concentrated on managing Grizco Racing, a Busch East Series team owned by Steve and Peg Griswold, which became Andy Santerre Motorsports.  With driver Sean Caisse, the team finished second to Mike Olsen, the grandson of popular Northeastern driver Stub Fadden, in the 2006 Busch East Championship.  Caisse also drew the attention of Kevin Harvick, who signed him to a driver development contract.

In 2007, Caisse was joined by Jeffrey Earnhardt, son of Kerry Earnhardt and grandson of Dale Earnhardt, to race in a second Santerre Camping World Wast East car under NASCAR's new rule reducing the minimum age in the Grand National and Whelen Modified divisions to 16. Caisse won four races and finished second in points to champion and rookie of the year Joey Logano. Earnhardt would place fifth in the standings. Caisse and Earnhardt would move on from Andy Santerre Motorsports to pursue other opportunities.

In 2008, Richard Childress' grandson and RCR development driver 17-year-old Austin Dillon signed on to drive the No. 3 Garage Equipment Supply Chevrolet for Andy Santerre Motorsports.

After running his own team in the Camping World East/K&N Pro Series East series for several years, Santerre spent two years as competition director for Rev Racing, and in 2012 joined Hattori Racing Enterprises in that position. After the 2012 season, he accepted a non-racing job offer in his native Maine, announcing his semi-retirement from racing activities.

Motorsports career results

NASCAR
(key) (Bold – Pole position awarded by qualifying time. Italics – Pole position earned by points standings or practice time. * – Most laps led.)

Busch Series

Craftsman Truck Series

References

External links

Living people
1968 births
People from Washington County, Maine
People with Guillain–Barré syndrome
Racing drivers from Maine
NASCAR drivers
NASCAR team owners